An ignition magneto (also called a high-tension magneto) is an older type of ignition system used in spark-ignition engines (such as petrol engines). It uses a magneto and a transformer to make pulses of high voltage for the spark plugs. The older term "high-tension" means "high-voltage".

Used on many cars in the early 20th century, ignition magnetos were largely replaced by induction coil ignition systems. The use of ignition magnetos is now confined mainly to engines without a battery, for example in lawnmowers and chainsaws.  It is also used in  modern piston-engined aircraft (even though a battery is present), to avoid the engine relying on an electrical system.

Design 

A simple magneto (an electrical generator using permanent magnets) is able to produce relatively low voltage electricity, however it is unable to produce the high voltages required by a spark plug as used in most modern engines (aside from diesel engines). An ignition magneto also includes an electrical transformer, which converts the electricity to a higher voltage (with the trade-off being a corresponding reduction in the output current).

In the type known as a shuttle magneto, the engine rotates a coil of wire between the poles of a magnet. In the inductor magneto, the magnet is rotated and the coil remains stationary.

As the magnet moves with respect to the coil, the magnetic flux linkage of the coil changes. This induces an EMF in the coil, which in turn causes a current to flow. One or more times per revolution, just as the magnet pole moves away from the coil and the magnetic flux begins to decrease, a cam opens the contact breaker (called “the points” in reference to the two points of a circuit breaker) and interrupts the current. This causes the electromagnetic field in the primary coil to collapse rapidly. As the field collapses rapidly there is a large voltage induced (as described by Faraday's Law) across the primary coil.

As the points begin to open, point spacing is initially such that the voltage across the primary coil would arc across the points. A capacitor is placed across the points which absorbs the energy stored in the leakage inductance of the primary coil, and slows the rise time of the primary winding voltage to allow the points to open fully. The capacitor's function is similar to that of a snubber as found in a flyback converter.

A second coil, with many more turns than the primary, is wound on the same iron core to form an electrical transformer. The ratio of turns in the secondary winding to the number of turns in the primary winding, is called the turns ratio. Voltage across the primary coil results in a proportional voltage being induced across the secondary winding of the coil. The turns ratio between the primary and secondary coil is selected so that the voltage across the secondary reaches a very high value, enough to arc across the gap of the spark plug. As the voltage of the primary winding rises to several hundred volts, the voltage on the secondary winding rises to several tens of thousands of volts, since the secondary winding typically has 100 times as many turns as the primary winding.

The capacitor and the coil together form a resonant circuit which allows the energy to oscillate from the capacitor to the coil and back again.  Due to the inevitable losses in the system, this oscillation decays fairly rapidly. This dissipates the energy that was stored in the condenser in time for the next closure of the points, leaving the condenser discharged and ready to repeat the cycle.

On more advanced magnetos the cam ring can be rotated by an external linkage to alter the ignition timing.

In a modern installation, the magneto only has a single low tension winding which is connected to an external ignition coil which not only has a low tension winding, but also a secondary winding of many thousands of turns to deliver the high voltage required for the spark plug(s). Such a system is known as an "energy transfer" ignition system. Initially this was done because it was easier to provide good insulation for the secondary winding of an external coil than it was in a coil buried in the construction of the magneto (early magnetos had the coil assembly externally to the rotating parts to make them easier to insulate—at the expense of efficiency). In more modern times, insulation materials have improved to the point where constructing self-contained magnetos is relatively easy, but energy transfer systems are still used where the ultimate in reliability is required such as in aviation engines.

Impulse coupling
Because the magneto has low voltage output at low speed, starting an engine is more difficult. Therefore, some magnetos have an impulse coupling, a springlike mechanical linkage between the engine and magneto drive shaft which "winds up" and "lets go" at the proper moment for spinning the magneto shaft. The impulse coupling uses a spring, a hub cam with flyweights, and a shell. The hub of the magneto rotates while the drive shaft is held stationary, and the spring tension builds up.  When the magneto is supposed to fire, the flyweights are released by the action of the body contacting the trigger ramp. This allows the spring to unwind giving the rotating magnet a rapid rotation  and letting the magneto spin at such a speed to produce a spark.

History 
The first person to develop the idea of a high-tension magneto was André Boudeville, but his design omitted a condenser (capacitor). In the late 1890s, English engineer Frederick Richard Simms and German engineer Robert Bosch developed the first practical high-tension magneto.

The first car to use magneto ignition was the 1901 German Mercedes 35 hp racing car, followed by various cars produced by Benz, Mors, Turcat-Mery, and Nesseldorf. Ignition magnetos were soon was used on most cars, for both low voltage systems (which used secondary coils to fire the spark plugs) and high voltage magnetos (which fired the spark plug directly, similar to induction coil ignition). Ignition magnetos were largely replaced by ignition coils once batteries became common in cars, since a battery-operated coil can provide a high-voltage spark even at low speeds, making starting easier.

Usage in aircraft engines 

Because it requires no battery or other source of electrical energy, the magneto is a compact and reliable self-contained ignition system, which is why it remains in use in many general aviation applications.

Since the beginning of World War I in 1914, magneto-equipped aircraft engines have  typically been dual-plugged, whereby each cylinder has two spark plugs, with each plug having a separate magneto system.  Dual plugs provide both redundancy should a magneto fail, and better engine performance (through enhanced combustion). Twin sparks provide two flame fronts within the cylinder, these two flame fronts decreasing the time needed for the fuel charge to burn. As the size of the combustion chamber determines the time to burn the fuel charge, dual ignition was especially important for the large-bore aircraft engines around World War II where it was necessary to combust the entire fuel mixture in a shorter time than a single plug could provide, in order to build peak cylinder pressure at the rpm desired.

References

Magneto
Electrical generators